Virgolândia is a Brazilian municipality in the state of Minas Gerais. As of 2020 its population is estimated to be 5,340.

References

Municipalities in Minas Gerais